Leptus intermedius is a species of mite belonging to the family Erythraeidae. This is a large, oval mite with a total length of 1.7 mm. The body is densely hairy and there is one pair of eyes. The fourth pair of legs is longer than the body. This species has been recorded only in the Bathurst area of South Africa.

References
Nine new species of the superfamily Erythraeoidea (Acarina: Trombidiformes) associated with plants in South Africa, Magdalena K.P. Meyer & P.A.J. Ryke, Acarologia I

Trombidiformes
Animals described in 1959
Arachnids of Africa